Joe McClelland (12 October 1935 – 24 April 1999) was a Scottish footballer, who played for Hibernian and Wrexham. McClelland appeared for Hibernian in the 1958 Scottish Cup Final and made over 250 appearances for the club in all competitions.

References

External links 
Joe McClelland, www.ihibs.co.uk

1935 births
1999 deaths
Footballers from Edinburgh
Association football fullbacks
Scottish footballers
Armadale Thistle F.C. players
Hibernian F.C. players
Wrexham A.F.C. players
Scottish Football League players
English Football League players